Thandege Thakka Maga is a 2006 Indian Kannada-language action drama film directed by S. Mahendar and produced by R. Pavan Kumar. The film stars Ambareesh and Upendra along with Laila, Sakshi Shivanand and Ashish Vidyarthi in other prominent roles. The film had a musical score and soundtrack composed by S. A. Rajkumar.

The film is a remake of the Tamil film Thevar Magan (1992) directed by Bharathan and starred Sivaji Ganesan and Kamal Haasan.

The film released to generally average reviews from critics and was one of the sleeper hits of the year 2006.

Cast 
 Ambareesh as Chowdaiah
 Upendra as Sathya
 Laila Mehdin as Pancharangi
 Sakshi Shivanand as Bhanu
 Ashish Vidyarthi as Dharmanna
 Srinivasa Murthy as Veeraiah
 M.N Lakshmi Devi
 Ramesh Bhat
 Komal Kumar
 Bank Janardhan
 B. V. Radha
 Shankar Ashwath
 Chitra Shenoy

Soundtrack 
The music of the film was composed by S. A. Rajkumar. Three songs were reused from the original version which was composed by Ilaiyaraaja. The soundtrack was appreciated by the critics.

See also 
 Thevar Magan
 Virasat

References

External links 
 
 Thandege Thakka Maga review at Nowrunning.com
 Sify reviews the film

2006 films
2000s Kannada-language films
Indian action films
Kannada remakes of Tamil films
Films directed by S. Mahendar
Films about feuds
2006 action films